Wig! is an album by American singer-songwriter Peter Case, released in 2010.

History
Case had suffered heart problems and had major heart surgery in 2009. After his recovery, the album was made quickly and spontaneously. It is described as "the sweet spot where garage rock, punk, and the visceral wail of blues converge", diverging from Case's previous alternative folk and country blues.

Critical reception

Writing for Allmusic, music critic Paul Carino wrote of the album "the off-the-cuff vibe creates a thrilling authenticity, hitting the sweet spot where garage rock, punk, and the visceral wail of blues converge." Bart Mendoza, writing for San Diego Troubadour, gave the album a positive review, calling it "a welcome addition to Cases’s canon and proof positive that his muse is just as strong as ever."

Track listing

Personnel
Peter Case – vocals, guitar, harmonica, piano, bass
Ron Franklin – guitar, piano, slide guitar
Duane Jarvis – guitar, percussion
D.J. Bonebrake – drums, percussion
Bryan Head – drums, percussion
Dave Meshell – bass
Production notes:
Peter Case – producer
Pete Lyman – engineer
Gavin Lurssen – mastering
Nathaniel Alford – mixing
Andrew Bush – engineer, mixing
Ron Franklin – engineer, mixing
Denise Sullivan – cover photo, photography
Frank Lee Drennen – photography
Michael Triplett – package design
Doug Erb – design

References

2010 albums
Peter Case albums
Yep Roc Records albums